Mistakes is a 2021 Czech romantic drama film directed by Jan Prušinovský. It tells the story of lovers Ema and Tomáš whose relationship gets affected by Ema's past. It received Czech Lion Award for Best Actress in Leading Role.

Cast
 Pavla Gajdošíková as Ema
 Jan Jankovský as Tomáš
 Ondřej Kokorský as Igor
 Ivo Gogál as Dušan
 Jan Kolařík as Kloc
 Eva Hacurová as Věra
 Marta Dancingerová as Jarka
 Slávek Bílský as Karel
 Monika Načeva as Zdena, Tomáš' mother
 Karolína Frydecká as Renata, Ema's mother
 Kryštof Rímský as Alfa
 Michaela Petřeková as Ilona
 Vít Roleček as Marek
 Martin Dusbaba as Leo

References

External links
 
 Mistakes at CSFD.cz 

2021 films
2021 romantic drama films
Czech romantic drama films
2020s Czech-language films
Czech Lion Awards winners (films)